SMS Kaiser Max was an ironclad warship built for the Austro-Hungarian Navy in the 1870s, the lead ship of the . The ship was purportedly the same vessel that had been laid down in 1861, and had simply been reconstructed. This was a fiction, however; the head of the Austro-Hungarian Navy could not secure funding for new ships, but reconstruction projects were uncontroversial, so he "rebuilt" the three earlier s. Only the engines and parts of the armor plate were reused in the new Kaiser Max, which was laid down in February 1874, launched in December 1875, and commissioned in October 1876. The ship's career was fairly limited, in part due to slender naval budgets that prevented much active use. She made foreign visits and took part in limited training exercises in the 1880s and 1890s. Long since obsolete, Kaiser Max was removed from service in 1904 and converted into a barracks ship. After World War I, the ship was transferred to the Royal Yugoslav Navy as a war prize and renamed Tivat. Her fate thereafter is uncertain, either being sold for scrap in 1924 or retained through 1941.

Design

She displaced . As was common for ironclads of the period, she had a pronounced ram bow. She had a crew of 400 officers and enlisted men. 

Her propulsion system consisted of one single-expansion marine steam engine that drove a single screw propeller. The number and type of her coal-fired boilers have not survived, but they were vented through a single funnel placed slightly forward of amidships. The ship was fitted with a three-masted sailing rig to supplement the steam engines.

Kaiser Max was a casemate ship, and she was armed with a main battery of eight  20-caliber (cal.) guns manufactured by Krupp mounted in a central casemate, four on each broadside. She also carried four  24-cal. guns, two  15-cal. landing guns, six  35-cal. quick-firing guns, three  Hotchkiss revolver cannon, and two  guns. Kaiser Max also had four  torpedo tubes, one in the bow, one in the stern, and one on each broadside.

Service history

Kaiser Max was laid down at the Stabilimento Tecnico Triestino shipyard on 14 February 1874. The ship was ostensibly the same vessel that had been laid down in 1861, as the Austro-Hungarian parliament had approved a so-called reconstruction program of that . The head of the Austro-Hungarian Navy, Vice Admiral Friedrich von Pöck, had resorted to subterfuge to circumvent parliamentary hostility to new ironclad construction; he requested funds to modernize the earlier vessel, but in fact, he had that vessel broken up, with only the machinery, parts of the armor plate, and other miscellaneous equipment being incorporated into the new ship. She was launched on 28 December 1875 and completed by 26 October 1876, when she was commissioned into the Austro-Hungarian fleet. The ship began her sea trials on 8 May 1877.

The government placed a low priority on naval activities, particularly in the 1870s; as a result, the shortage of funds precluded an active fleet policy. The ironclad fleet, including Kaiser Max, was kept out of service in Pola, laid up in reserve; the only vessels to see significant service in the 1870s were several screw frigates sent abroad. In 1880, Kaiser Max had her sailing rig reduced. This was the largest squadron of the Austro-Hungarian Navy that had operated outside the Adriatic. In June and July 1889, Kaiser Max participated in fleet training exercises, which also included the ironclads Custoza, Tegetthoff, Prinz Eugen, and Don Juan d'Austria.

A new construction program in the late 1890s and early 1900s required the Austro-Hungarian Navy to discard old, obsolete vessels to reduce annual budgets. These ships were largely reused in secondary roles. Kaiser Max was stricken from the naval register on 30 December 1904 and withdrawn from service. She was converted into a barracks ship and in 1909, assigned to Cattaro Bay to serve the Arsenal Teodo, where she remained through World War I. 

In 1920, having lost the war, the now-defunct Austro-Hungarian Empire ceded the ship to the newly formed Royal Yugoslav Navy. The ship's fate after entering Yugoslav service is unclear. She was renamed Tivat, according to Conway's All the World's Fighting Ships later became Neretva, serving through 1941; her ultimate fate after the Axis invasion of Yugoslavia in 1941 is unknown. According to the naval historian Milan Vego, however, the Yugoslav Navy sold the ship for scrap in 1924.

Notes

References

Further reading
 

Kaiser Max-class ironclads (1875)
1875 ships